Party mix is a snack mix served at parties or other social gatherings.  Party Mix also refers to:

 Party Mix!, an EP by The B-52's
 Party Mix (video game), a Starpath Supercharger game for the Atari 2600